The 2007 Pan American Mountain Bike Continental Championships were held from March 8 to March 11, 2007 in Neuquén, Argentina.

Elite Men

Elite Women

References
infobiker
cyclingnews

2007 in mountain biking
Pan Am
Mountain biking events
International cycle races hosted by Argentina